Blackfalds is a town in central Alberta, Canada. It is located along Highway 2A 13.5 km north of Red Deer. The town's name, Waghorn (for Walter Waghorn, post master), changed in 1903 to Blackfalds, after Blackfalds, a Scottish hamlet.

Demographics 

At its current population, Blackfalds is one of the largest towns in the province and is eligible for city status. According to Alberta's Municipal Government Act, a town is eligible for city status when it reaches 10,000 residents.

In the 2016 Census of Population conducted by Statistics Canada, the Town of Blackfalds recorded a population of 9,328 living in 3,302 of its 3,552 total private dwellings, a  change from its 2011 population of 6,300.

Amenities 
The town has many public facilities such as:
 Blackfalds Public Library, located in the Eagle Builders Centre on Waghorn Street.
 Blackfalds All Wheels Park and Blackfalds Bike Skills Park are located on Womacks Road off of Vista Trail.
 Tayles Water Spray Park, located next to the Cultural Centre.
 Blackfalds All-Star Park, located in the southwest corner of Blackfalds.
 Eagle Builders Centre, formerly Blackfalds Multiplex, home to the Blackfalds Bulldogs ice hockey team.
 Blackfalds Abbey Centre, a Multi-Purpose Fitness Facility and Outdoor Aquatic Centre.

Education 
The town has three public schools in the Wolf Creek school district and one catholic school in the Red Deer Catholic Regional Schools district:
 Iron Ridge Elementary Campus
 Iron Ridge Intermediate Campus 
 Iron Ridge Junior Campus; and
 St. Gregory the Great Catholic School.

Media 
The Town of Blackfalds is primarily served by regional weekly newspapers and one major daily. As of 2018, the town no longer has a newspaper of their own as the Blackfalds LIFE, which began circulation in August 2014, closed.

Blackfalds has access to rdnewsNOW, and receives the Red Deer Advocate and Lacombe Express.

Blackfalds is served by numerous radio stations from Red Deer and Lacombe, including Kraze 101.3 (CKIK), Real Country 95.5, Zed 99, Sunny 94, Big 105, X 100.7 (CKEX) and 106.7 Rewind Radio.

Sports 
The Blackfalds Bulldogs, formerly the Calgary Mustangs, of the AJHL will begin play in Blackfalds in 2021.

See also 
List of communities in Alberta
List of towns in Alberta

References

External links 

 
1904 establishments in Alberta
Towns in Alberta